Jeremy Elson (born 1974) is a computer researcher specializing in wireless Sensor Networks.  He is also the creator of the popular CircleMUD.  Elson received his Ph.D. from UCLA in 2003. He previously worked at Microsoft Research, in the Distributed Systems and Security group within Systems and Networking Research. Recent projects include MapCruncher and ASIRRA. In 2015, he started his career at Google.  Jeremy is also known for his work on calculating whether a powerball ticket can ever be profitable.

External links
 Jeremy Elson's home page
 Mega Millions and Powerball: Can you ever expect a ticket to be profitable?

1974 births
Living people
MUD developers
University of California, Los Angeles alumni